Events in the year 1257 in Norway.

Incumbents
Monarch: Haakon IV Haakonson and Magnus VI Haakonsson (as junior king)

Events
 A peace agreement was made between Christopher I of Denmark and Haakon IV, ending a war between Denmark and Norway that had started the year before.

Arts and literature

Births

Deaths
3 May – Haakon the Young, (Junior) King (born 1232).

References

Norway